"Hot Knives" is the second single by the American indie/folk-rock band Bright Eyes, from their album Cassadaga. The song was released on July 9, 2007, on a strictly-limited 7" double A-side record.

Conor Oberst, the band's frontman, allegedly said "Hot Knives is a song.. um, sort of about a woman that kind of discovers that her life is a sham and can't really exist in her reality any longer and has to transform completely into a new, uh, species. It sounds crazy, but it's not that crazy. It could happen to you, too" on the NME Track-by-Track.

Track listing
 Hot Knives
 If The Brakeman Turns My Way

Personnel
Conor Oberst - Guitar, Vocals, Piano
Mike Mogis - Guitar, Bass, Dobro
Nate Walcott - Piano, Strings
Maria Taylor - Vocals, Drums
M. Ward - Guitar
Janet Weiss - Drums
Stacy DuPree - Vocals
Sherri DuPree - Vocals
Z Berg - Vocals
Rachael Yamagata - Vocals
Bill Meyers – Conductor

Trivia
Bright Eyes played "Hot Knives" on July 4, 2007, on Late Show with David Letterman.

Music video

The video for "Hot Knives" was directed by Patrick Daughters, who also directed "Title and Registration" (Death Cab for Cutie), "Stockholm Syndrome" (Muse), and the video for the previous Bright Eyes single, "Four Winds".

References

Bright Eyes (band) songs
2007 singles
Saddle Creek Records singles
2007 songs
Polydor Records singles